Humus is a Canadian documentary film, directed by Carole Poliquin and released in 2022. The film centres on Mélina Plante and François D'Aoust, a farming couple in Havelock, Quebec, who are implementing sustainable agriculture techniques on their farm in response to the high worldwide risk of topsoil erosion.

The film premiered on May 20, 2022, in Montreal.

The film received a Canadian Screen Award nomination for Best Original Music in a Documentary (Delphine Measroch) at the 11th Canadian Screen Awards in 2023.

References

External links

2022 films
2022 documentary films
Canadian documentary films
2020s Canadian films
French-language Canadian films
2020s French-language films
Quebec films
Documentary films about agriculture